A  is a local administrative unit in Japan.

Geographically, a village's extent is contained within a prefecture.

It is larger than an actual settlement, being in actuality a subdivision of a rural , which are subdivided into towns and villages with no overlap and no uncovered area.

As a result of mergers and elevation to higher statuses, the number of villages in Japan is decreasing.

Currently, 13 prefectures no longer have any villages: Tochigi (since March 20, 2006), Fukui (since March 3, 2006), Ishikawa (since March 1, 2005), Shizuoka (since July 1, 2005), Hyōgo (since April 1, 1999), Mie (since November 1, 2005), Shiga (since January 1, 2005), Hiroshima (since November 5, 2004), Yamaguchi (since March 20, 2006), Ehime (since January 16, 2005), Kagawa (since April 1, 1999), Nagasaki (since October 1, 2005), and Saga (since March 20, 2006).

The six villages in the Northern Territories dispute and Atarashiki-mura (which is an autonomous village community) are not included in the list below.

Villages

Notes

See also 

 Municipalities of Japan
 List of cities in Japan 
 List of towns in Japan 
 Japanese addressing system
 Edo period village

Subdivisions of Japan
 
Japan